So Much for Substitutes is the second official album release by Christian rock band Downhere, 1st album to include current bassist Glenn Lavender, and last album released under Word Records. The label dropped the band from their roster in 2004, despite the band garnering nominations and awards for the album; 2003 Covenant Award for Modern Rock/Alternative Album of the Year, nomination for both the 2004 GMA Music Award for Rock/Contemporary Album of the Year, and the 2004 Juno Award for Contemporary Christian/Gospel Album of the Year. The song "What It's Like" won the 2003 Covenant Award for Alternative Song of the Year and the song "Breaking Me Down" won the 2004 GMA Music Award for Modern Rock Recorded Song of the Year.

Track listing
All songs written by Jason Germain and Marc Martel. Tracks 3 & 7 co-written with Glenn Lavender.

 "What It's Like" – 3:42
 "Stone" – 3:54
 "Breaking Me Down" – 3:19
 "Iliad" – 5:04
 "Starspin" - 5:56
 "Feels Like Winter" – 3:37
 "Walls" – 3:50
 "How They Love Each Other" – 3:42
 "Headed" – 3:23
 "In America" – 3:50
 "Comatose" – 4:08
 "Last Night's Daydream" – 6:45
 "Home" (hidden track) – 4:39

Personnel 

Downhere
 Jason Germain – lead and backing vocals, acoustic piano, keyboards, Hammond B3 organ, acoustic guitar, group vocals 
 Marc Martel – lead and backing vocals, acoustic guitar, electric guitar, sitar, group vocals
 Glenn Lavender – acoustic guitar, bass guitar, string arrangements, group vocals
 Jeremy Thiessen – drums

Additional Musicians
 Ken Lewis – percussion 
 Richie Biggs – tambourine 
 Jimmie Lee Sloas – tambourine, group vocals 
 Bob Mason – cello
 Kristin Wilkinson – viola 
 David Angell – second violin 
 David Davidson – first violin 
 Amy Lorber – group vocals

Production
 Jimmie Lee Sloas – producer 
 Shawn McSpadden – executive producer 
 Blaine Barcus – A&R 
 Richie Biggs – recording, mixing 
 Peter Coleman – mixing 
 James Bauer – assistant engineer
 Jeremy David Cottrell – assistant engineer, mix assistant 
 Brandon Epps – assistant engineer
 Erick Jaskowiak – assistant engineer
 Mike Knowles – assistant engineer 
 Michael Modesto – assistant engineer 
 Vance Powell – assistant engineer 
 David Yeager – assistant engineer 
 Stephen Marcussen – mastering 
 Tammie Harris Cleek – creative director 
 Wayne Brezkina – art direction, design layout
 David Johnson – photography 
 David Kay – wardrobe design 
 Robin Geary – grooming

Singles
 "Breaking Me Down" (2003)
 "Starspin" (2003/2004)
 "What It's Like" (2003/2004)

References

2003 albums
Downhere albums
Word Records albums
Albums produced by Jimmie Lee Sloas